Miguel Saturnino Aurrecoechea Palacios (born 1 January, 1904 in Villaverde) was a Spanish clergyman and auxiliary bishop for the Roman Catholic Diocese of Machiques, and earlier for the titular see of  Doliche. He was ordained in 1936. He was appointed bishop in 1955. He died in 1997.

References

Spanish Roman Catholic bishops
1904 births
1997 deaths
Roman Catholic bishops of Machiques